Forough (Persian: فروغ ) is a Persian feminine given name meaning brightness. People with that name include:

Forough Farrokhzad (1934–1967), influential Iranian poet and film director
Forough Abbasi (born 1993), Iranian alpine skier

See also
 Foroughi, a surname
Forugh-e Javidan (disambiguation)